United Theological College (UTC) is an Eccumenical Christian seminary founded in 1910 situated in the southern city of Bangalore in the state of Karnataka in South India and affiliated to India's first Theological University, the Senate of Serampore College (University) {a University under Section 2 (f) of the University Grants Commission Act, 1956}with degree-granting authority validated by a Danish Charter and ratified by the Government of West Bengal.

Currently, the principalship is held by the Old Testament Scholar, The Rev. Ch. Vasantha Rao, CSI, Dr.theol. (Hamburg), an alma mater of this institution and an acknowledged lead in Old Testament studies and Biblical Hebrew language, having been groomed by the Old Testament Scholar, Victor Premasagar, CSI, throughout his Spiritual formation period, beginning with his graduate and post-graduate studies, well into his doctoral studies.  Vasantha Rao is also known for his continuing association with the fully ecumenical Society for Biblical Studies in India (SBSI) right from the New millennium to the Golden Jubilee conclave held in 2012, where he was elected President, at the Ecumenical Christian Centre, Whitefield and continues to steer the Society.

The College
Since 1976, it has been granted the status of an autonomous college under the University.  The college has welcomed world leaders. Mahatma Gandhi visited it in 1927 and declared, To live the gospel is the most effective way…I can say that the life of service and uttermost simplicity is the best preaching.  India Post released a centenary commemorative stamp in honor of the United Theological College (UTC) on 8 July 2011.

Motto 
UTC's motto comes from Matthew 20:28 in the Vulgate: SICUT FILIUS HOMINIS NON VENIT MINISTRARI SED MINISTRARE ET DARE ANIMAM SUAM REDEMPTIONEM PRO MULTIS which translates as "Even as the Son of man is not come to be ministered unto, but to minister and to give his life a redemption for many". It is sometimes condensed to Not to be Served but to Serve.  In the University emblem the motto is in Greek (not in Latin): οὐ... διακονηθῆναι ἀλλὰ διακονῆσαι

Courses offered 
The UTC was granted autonomy in the year 1976 by the Senate of Serampore College (University). The following are the courses offered by the College:

 Diploma in Women's Studies
 Certificate Course in Christian Studies
 Diploma for Proficiency in Counselling
 Diploma in Young Men's Christian Association Professional Secretaryship
 Bachelor of Divinity, B.Div.
 Master of Theology, Th.M.
 Doctor of Theology, Th.D.

Exchange programs 
The UTC has exchange programs with the Theological Faculty of the University of Basel Switzerland and the Divinity School of the University of Edinburgh, Scotland. It has a Memorandum of Understanding signed by Revd Dr O V Jathanna and Prof Kenneth Brown with the University of Edinburgh wherein a post-graduate student can study a semester in Bengaluru.

Publications 

 Bangalore Theological Forum, an academic journal brought out twice a year.
 Masihi Sevak, a pastoral magazine with three releases in a year.
 Hymns of the Tamil Śaivite Saints an English Translation of the Tiruvacakam, by Francis Kingsbury and GE Phillips (edited by Fred Goodwill)

Campus life 
The college had been a recipient of prizes from the Mysore Horticultural Society, Bengaluru for well-maintained gardens and lawns. Good environment for study purpose.

Library 
The college has a massive library including 200-year-old palm leaf manuscripts. The United States Embassy awarded a grant for preservation of these rare palm leaf manuscripts in 2006.

Present Faculty

Succession of Administrators
Academic administrators who have led the seminary have been designated Principal.

Notable people

Further reading

References

External links 

Seminaries and theological colleges in India
Colleges in Bangalore
Educational institutions established in 1910
Reformed church seminaries and theological colleges
Anglican seminaries and theological colleges
Presbyterian universities and colleges
Christian seminaries and theological colleges in India
1910 establishments in India
Universities and colleges affiliated with the Church of South India
Seminaries and theological colleges affiliated to the Senate of Serampore College (University)
India